Bryce Wandler (born February 25, 1979) is a Canadian former professional ice hockey goaltender.

Wandler played major junior hockey in the Western Hockey League from 1996 to 2000. He was rewarded for his outstanding play during the 1999–2000 WHL season by being awarded the Del Wilson Trophy as the league's top goaltender. Wandler was also named to the 1999–2000 Canadian Hockey League Second All-Star Team.

Wandler went on to play three seasons (2000 – 2003) of professional hockey in the North American minor leagues.

Following his retirement from professional hockey, Wandler continued to play senior AAA hockey with the Bentley Generals of the Chinook Hockey League.

Awards and honours

References

External links

1979 births
Living people
Canadian ice hockey goaltenders
Charlotte Checkers (1993–2010) players
Edmonton Ice players
Hartford Wolf Pack players
Kamloops Blazers players
Lexington Men O' War players
New Haven Knights players
San Angelo Saints players
Swift Current Broncos players
Ice hockey people from Alberta
Canadian expatriate ice hockey players in the United States